Events from the year 1945 in art.

Events
 April 12 – President of the United States Franklin D. Roosevelt collapses while having a portrait painted by Elizabeth Shoumatoff at Warm Springs, Georgia, dying shortly afterwards.
 April 15 – Bergen-Belsen concentration camp liberated. Among the British war artists (official and unofficial) who record it soon afterwards are Sgt. Eric Taylor, Leslie Cole, Doris Zinkeisen, Edgar Ainsworth (of Picture Post, Mervyn Peake and Mary Kessell.
 April 28 – Professor Anthony Blunt is appointed to succeed Sir Kenneth Clark as Surveyor of the King's Pictures in the United Kingdom.
 May
 Allied forces reach the Nazi stolen art repository in the salt mines at Altaussee in Austria, finding more than 6,500 paintings.
 Retreating SS forces destroy the Klimt University of Vienna Ceiling Paintings in store at Schloss Immendorf.
 Ben Nicholson paints still lifes incorporating British Union Flags to mark V-E Day.
 July–December – Han van Meegeren paints his last forgery of a Dutch Golden Age painting, Jesus among the Doctors, before witnesses in Amsterdam to refute charges of having sold genuine Dutch cultural property to Nazis (for which he was arrested on May 29).
 October 25 – Jackson Pollock marries Lee Krasner.
 Constantine Andreou moves to France, having received a scholarship from the French government.
 New York businessman Henry Pearlman acquires Chaïm Soutine's View of Céret, the foundation of his collection of modern art.

Awards
 Archibald Prize: William Dargie – Lt-General The Hon Edmund Herring, KBC, DSO, MC, ED

Exhibitions
 January – Mark Rothko exhibition in the Daylight Gallery of Peggy Guggenheim's The Art of This Century gallery in Manhattan.
 March 19 – Jackson Pollock's second solo exhibition opens in the Daylight Gallery of Peggy Guggenheim's The Art of This Century gallery in Manhattan.

Works

 David Alfaro Siqueiros – El Coronelazo
 C. C. Beall – Now... All Together (War Loan poster)
 Hyman Bloom – Christmas Tree
 Marc Chagall – Apocalypse in Lilac, Capriccio
 Leslie Cole
 Belsen Camp – The Compound for Women
 Death pits at Bergen-Belsen
 Salvador Dalí
 The Apotheosis of Homer
 Basket of Bread
 Portrait of a Passionate Woman (The Hands)
 Fernando Álvarez de Sotomayor y Zaragoza – Portrait of General Franco
 Colin Colahan – Ballet of Wind and Rain
 Russell Drysdale – The Drover's Wife
 Alfred Eisenstaedt – V-J Day in Times Square (photograph)
 Max Ernst – The Temptation of Saint Anthony
 Nora Heysen – Transport driver (Aircraftswoman Florence Miles)
 Georg Mayer-Marton – Women with Boulders
 Pablo Picasso – The Charnel House
 Jackson Pollock – Troubled Queen (Museum of Fine Arts, Boston)
 Joe Rosenthal – Raising the Flag on Iwo Jima (photograph)
 Ben Shahn
 Death on the Beach
 Liberation
 Elizabeth Shoumatoff – Unfinished portrait of Franklin D. Roosevelt
 Janet Sobel – Illusion of Solidity
 Philip Zec – Here you are. Don't lose it again! (political cartoon)
 Doris Zinkeisen – Human Laundry, Belsen

Births
 January 20 – Susan Rothenberg, American painter
 January 25 – Barbara Kruger, American photographer, graphic artist and sculptor
 January 31 – Joseph Kosuth, American conceptual artist
 March 4 – Rose Finn-Kelcey, English performance and installation artist (d.2014)
 March 8 – Anselm Kiefer, German sculptor
 June 2 – Richard Long, English land artist
 June 14 – Jörg Immendorff, German painter, sculptor, stage designer and art professor (d.2007)
 June 30 – Sean Scully, Irish-born painter
 July 16 – Victor Sloan, Irish visual artist
 July 28 – Jim Davis, American cartoonist, creator of "Garfield"
 August 4 – Paul McCarthy, American sculptor and installation and video artist
 August 6 – Duggie Fields, English painter (d.2012)
 August 9 – Posy Simmonds, English cartoonist
 August 18 – Brummbaer, German digital artist
 August 19 – Peter Reginato, American sculptor
 September 27 – Jack Goldstein, Canadian-born American performance and conceptual artist turned painter (d.2003)
 October 13 – Heinz Plank, German painter, draughtsman and graphic artist
 October 23 – Maggi Hambling, English painter and sculptor
 November 14 – David Nash, English sculptor and academic
 December 18 – Nasser Khalili, Iranian-British collector, art scholar, investor and philanthropist
 date unknown
 Suzanne Lacy, American installation, video and performance artist
 Daisy Youngblood, American ceramic artist and sculptor

Deaths
 January 3 - René Gimpel, French art dealer (b. 1881)
 January 7 – Alexander Stirling Calder, American sculptor (b. 1870)
 February 7 – H. J. Ward, American illustrator (b. 1909)
 February 21 – Anne Marie Carl-Nielsen, Danish sculptor (born 1863)
 March 5 – Albert Richards, English war artist (b. 1919); killed on active service in the Netherlands
 March 6 – Milena Pavlović-Barili, Serbian painter and poet (b. 1909); died in riding accident in the United States
 March 10 – Eleanor Fortescue-Brickdale, English painter (b. 1872)
 March 31 – Hando Ruus, Estonian painter (b. 1917); presumed executed as a prisoner of war in the Soviet Union
 April – Josef Čapek, Czech painter and writer (b. 1887); died in Bergen-Belsen concentration camp
 April 22 – Käthe Kollwitz, German painter, lithographer and sculptor (b. 1867)
 May 5 – René Lalique, French glass designer (b. 1860)
 June 15 – Nikola Avramov, Bulgarian painter (b. 1897)
 September 16 – David Young Cameron, Scottish painter and etcher (b. 1865)
 October 24 – Franklin Carmichael, Canadian painter (b. 1890)
 October 31 – Ignacio Zuloaga, Basque painter (b. 1870)
 November 23 – Ljubomir Ivanović, Serbian painter (b. 1882)
 November – Thomas Hennell, English painter (b. 1903); presumed killed on active service in Indonesia
 December 20 – Ong Schan Tchow, Chinese artist (b. 1900); died in Malaysia
 date unknown
 John Duncan, Scottish symbolist painter (b. 1866)
 Franz Sedlacek, Austrian painter (b. 1891); presumed killed on active service in Poland

See also
 1945 in fine arts of the Soviet Union

References

 
Years of the 20th century in art
1940s in art